Jesús Alberto Dueñas Manzo (born 16 March 1989), also known as El Pollo, is a Mexican professional footballer who plays as a defensive midfielder for Liga MX club Juárez.

Club career
Jesus Dueñas was from Petroleros de Salamanca but later moved to Tigres UANL, the team with which he debuted. Since 2014, Dueñas has become the starting central midfielder of Tigres. He played a key role in the Copa Libertadores 2015.

In the Apertura 2016 finals against Club América, the teams tied 1–1 in the first leg at Estadio Azteca. In the historical second leg, played for the first time on 25 December, the teams tied 0-0 and went to overtime at the Estadio Universitario. At 95' Edson Álvarez scored the 1-0 for América and at 119' Dueñas tied dramatically with a header after a cross from Jürgen Damm, and led the match to penalty shoot-out. Nahuel Guzmán stopped three shots and Tigres became the Apertura 2016 champions.

International career
In March 2015, Dueñas was called up to the senior national team by Miguel Herrera to compete in friendly matches against Ecuador and Paraguay. Dueñas played as starter in the 3–1 victory over Jamaica of the 2015 CONCACAF Gold Cup finals at the Lincoln Financial Field of Philadelphia on July 26, 2015.

Career statistics

Club

International

International goals
Scores and results list Mexico's goal tally first.

Honours
Tigres UANL
Liga MX: Apertura 2011, Apertura 2015, Apertura 2016, Apertura 2017, Clausura 2019
Copa MX: Clausura 2014
Campeón de Campeones: 2016, 2018
CONCACAF Champions League: 2020
Campeones Cup: 2018

Mexico
CONCACAF Gold Cup: 2015

Individual
Liga MX Best XI: Apertura 2016
CONCACAF Gold Cup Best XI: 2017
CONCACAF Champions League Team of the Tournament: 2019

References 

1989 births
Living people
Mexico international footballers
Association football midfielders
Salamanca F.C. footballers
Tigres UANL footballers
Liga MX players
Ascenso MX players
Footballers from Michoacán
Mexican footballers
People from Zamora, Michoacán
2015 CONCACAF Gold Cup players
Copa América Centenario players
2017 CONCACAF Gold Cup players
CONCACAF Gold Cup-winning players
2009 CONCACAF U-20 Championship players
Mexico under-20 international footballers